Jacques Fabbri (4 July 1925 – 24 December 1997) was a French actor.  He began his acting career in 1949, and acted in about 50 films.

Selected filmography

 Rendezvous in July (1949) - Bernard
 The Girl from Maxim's (1950) - Le duc
 The Seven Deadly Sins (1952) - Julien (segment "Luxure, La / Lust")
 Three Women (1952) - Albert (segment "Mouche")
 Women Are Angels (1952)  - Théodore
 My Brother from Senegal (1953) - Le brigadier de gendarmerie
 Daughters of Destiny (1954) - Pierre d'Arc (segment "Jeanne")
 Une vie de garçon (1954) - Octave
 The Unfrocked One (1954) - L'ordonnance
 Crainquebille (1954) - Le clochard distingué
 Les hommes ne pensent qu'à ça (1954) - M. Jacques - le garçon boucher
 Cadet Rousselle (1954) - Le colonel
 Les chiffonniers d'Emmaüs (1955) - Matthieu, le flic
 The Grand Maneuver (1955) - L'ordonnance d'Armand
 Mitsou ou Comment l'esprit vient aux filles... (1956) - Le vaguemestre
 On Foot, on Horse, and on Wheels (1957) - Auguste
 Ce joli monde (1957) - Ravaillac
 Fumée blonde (1957) - Le mari
 Secrets of a French Nurse (1958) - Docteur Carré
 Madame et son auto (1958) - L'aubergiste
 Les naufrageurs (1959) - Le gitan
 Bobosse (1959) - Le radio-reporter
 The Cat Shows Her Claws (1960) - Gustave - le chef du réseau Sud
 Love and the Frenchwoman (1960) - Train conductor (segment "Mariage, Le")
 Le pavé de Paris (1961) - Le père
 Les filles sèment le vent (1961)
 La Belle Américaine (1961) - Le gros / Fatso
 Napoleon II, the Eagle (1961) - Docteur Malfati
 Mon oncle du Texas (1962) - Le patron de l'hôtel de New York
 L'empire de la nuit (1962) - L'acrobate Strom
 Les pieds dans le plâtre (1965) - Achille
 The Lady in the Car with Glasses and a Gun (1970) - Doctor
 Daisy Town (1971) - Le maire (voice)
 The Suspects (1974) - Commissaire Bretonnet
 La Ballade des Dalton (1978) - Thadeus Collins, le directeur de prison (voice)
 I'm Shy, But I'll Heal (1978) - Le routier
 The Lady Banker (1980) - Moïse Nathanson
 Diva (1981) - Commissaire Jean Saporta
 Signé Furax (1981) - Le commissaire en uniforme
 Guy de Maupassant (1982) - Daremberg
 Un matin rouge (1982) - Robert
 Bonjour l'angoisse (1988) - Patron de café 1
  (1990) - Elledocq
 Croce e delizia (1995) - Germont (final film role)

References

1925 births
1997 deaths
French male film actors
French theatre directors
French male television actors
20th-century French male actors